An orphan school is a secular or religious institution dedicated to the education of children whose families cannot afford to have them educated.   In countries with universal public education systems, orphan schools are no longer common.

Orphan Schools in the United States 

The casualties of American Civil War did more than simply reduce the male population of the country, they also dramatically increased the number of widows and orphans. Many states reacted to the crisis by erecting new (or taking over existing) buildings to "care for, educate and train the children of fallen soldiers."

Orphan Schools in Ireland 

See Industrial Schools in Ireland

See also
 Orphanage
 Foundling hospital
 Residential education
 Girard College
 Friends of the Orphans
 Bellefaire Orphanage (Ohio)
 Bethesda Orphanage (Georgia)
 Girls and Boys Town (Nebraska)
 Leake and Watt's Children's Home (New York)
 St Joseph's Orphanage (Crescent Hill, Louisville)
 St. Cabrini Home (New York)
 Carversville Christian Orphanage (Carversville, Pennsylvania)
 Light of Hope Orphanage (Gore Orphanage)
 Sequoyah High School (Oklahoma)
Howard Colored Orphan Asylum (Weeksville, Brooklyn, NY)
 Masonic Home for Children (Oxford, North Carolina)
 Catholic Charities
 Howard Association
 United States Children's Bureau
 Orphans International
 Charles Loring Brace
 Roman Catholic Orphan School

References

External links
 Orphans' Home Website
 Records of the Pennsylvania Soldiers' Orphan Schools

Child welfare
Social welfare charities
School types
Adoption, fostering, orphan care and displacement